Bunjamin Shabani (born 30 January 1991 in Kumanovo) is an Albanian-Macedonian football player from the Republic of Macedonia, who is currently playing for Struga.

Club career

Partizani
Shabani followed coach Shpëtim Duro on his way out of Shkëndija to Albanian Superliga side Partizani Tirana ahead of the 2014-15 season.

External link 
Bunjamin Shabani at Soccerway

References 

1991 births
Living people
Sportspeople from Kumanovo
Albanian footballers from North Macedonia
Association football midfielders
Macedonian footballers
North Macedonia youth international footballers
FK Bashkimi players
FK Milano Kumanovo players
FK Shkupi players
KF Shkëndija players
FK Partizani Tirana players
FK Renova players
FC Shirak players
FC Drita players
Macedonian First Football League players
Kakkonen players
Kategoria Superiore players
Armenian Premier League players
Football Superleague of Kosovo players
Macedonian expatriate footballers
Expatriate footballers in Finland
Macedonian expatriate sportspeople in Finland
Expatriate footballers in Albania
Macedonian expatriate sportspeople in Albania
Expatriate footballers in Armenia
Macedonian expatriate sportspeople in Armenia
Expatriate footballers in Kosovo
Macedonian expatriate sportspeople in Kosovo